Elisabetta Piqué is an Italian-born Argentine journalist and Vatican correspondent for the newspaper La Nación. She wrote the biography Pope Francis: Life and Revolution (2013). The film Francis: Pray for Me is based on her book, and the character of the actress Silvia Abascal is based on her.

References

Argentine women journalists
Argentine women writers
Argentine biographers
Italian emigrants to Argentina
Living people
21st-century Argentine women writers
21st-century Argentine writers
Journalists from Florence
Women biographers
1967 births